The Council elections held in Wolverhampton on Thursday 6 May 1982 were one third, and 20 of the 60 seats were up for election.

1982 was the first year the SDP and Liberal Party stood in alliance.

1982 was also the first year of elections following boundary changes that saw the loss of Wednesfield Heath, Eastfield and Parkfield wards and the bringing in of Fallings Park, East Park and Heath Town wards.

Prior to the election the constitution of the Council was:

Labour 31
Conservative 28
Alliance 1

Following the election the constitution of the Council was:

Labour 33
Conservative 26
Alliance 1

Election result

1982
1982 English local elections
1980s in the West Midlands (county)
May 1982 events in the United Kingdom